Thought of You may refer to:

 "Thought of You", a 1983 song by John Denver from his album It's About Time
 "Thought of You", a 2016 song by John Park
 "Thought of You", a 2012 song by Justin Bieber from his album Believe